USS Currituck was a steamer acquired by the Union Navy for use during the American Civil War.

Her duties as a gunboat included river patrols, guard duty, and other duties as assigned.

Purchase and commission 

A wooden-hulled, screw-propelled steamer, the ship was built in New York City in 1843. She was purchased by the US Navy 20 September 1861 at New York City while under the name  Seneca; renamed Currituck; fitted for service at New York Navy Yard; and commissioned 27 February 1862, Acting Master W. F. Shankland in command. On March 31, 1862 Thomas G Hale was appointed by the Secretary of the navy as acting Master of the Currituck

Service history 

Currituck was ordered to tow  to Hampton Roads as soon as possible so that the revolutionary new ironclad might confront the Confederate Virginia (ex-). Departing New York City 6 March, Currituck and Monitor arrived Hampton Roads 8 March just in time to check the great successes of CSS Virginia.

Assigned to duty with the Potomac Flotilla, Currituck spent her entire service in the Chesapeake Bay and tributary waters cooperating with Army movements ashore. She performed guard and picket duty, capturing or destroying Confederate property and engaging Southern land forces frequently.

Between 4 May 1862 and 21 October 1863 she took eight vessels and aided in cutting out another, as well as capturing the fort at the confluence of the Pamunkey River and the Mattapony River and military stores at Carter's Creek.

Throughout the remainder of the war she cruised constantly up and down the inland waters of Virginia and in Chesapeake Bay convoying transports and hospital boats with sick and wounded from Fredericksburg, Virginia, sending scouting parties ashore from time to time.

Arriving at Washington, D.C., 31 July 1865, Currituck was decommissioned 4 August 1865 and sold 15 September 1865. The ship subsequently went into service as the merchant ship Arlington. Arlington was destroyed by fire at Mobile, Alabama, on 23 November 1870.

References 
 

Ships of the Union Navy
Steamships of the United States Navy
Gunboats of the United States Navy
American Civil War patrol vessels of the United States
1843 ships